Shri Yogeshwar Rishikul Inter College is a college in Lucknow, the capital city of Uttar Pradesh, India. It is situated in Mehndiganj near Shitla Devi Mandir. The college was established in 1905 with Baba Achardeva Guru as the first guru. It used to be a gurukul but is now an institute like any other college. It is also a government college.

Intermediate colleges in Uttar Pradesh
Schools in Lucknow
Educational institutions established in 1905
1905 establishments in India